Apperley Dene is a hamlet in Stocksfield parish, Northumberland, England. It is situated south of the River Tyne between Hexham and Newcastle upon Tyne.

References

External links

Villages in Northumberland